Sphaeramia is a genus of the Apogonidae (cardinalfishes). They are marine fish that live in shallow tropical reefs in the Indian and Pacific Oceans

Species
The recognized species in this genus are:
 Sphaeramia nematoptera (Bleeker, 1856) (pajama cardinalfish)
 Sphaeramia orbicularis (G. Cuvier, 1828) (orbiculate cardinalfish)

References

 
Apogoninae
Marine fish genera
Taxa named by Henry Weed Fowler
Taxa named by Barton Appler Bean